was the 9th daimyō of Shibata Domain in Echigo Province, Japan (modern-day Niigata Prefecture). His courtesy title was Izumo-no-kami, and his Court rank was Junior Fifth Rank, Lower Grade.

Biography
Mizoguchi Naotoki was the grandson of Mizoguchi Naoatsu and was adopted by his uncle Mizoguchi Naoyasu as his successor in 1786. His mother was a daughter of Matsudaira Tadachika of Tatebayashi Domain. Due to his youth, Naoyasu continued to rue the domain from retirement. He was received in formal audience by Shōgun Tokugawa Ienari in 1788. However, in 1789, the domain was ordered to exchange 20,000 koku of its territories in Echigo Province with an equivalent kokudaka of territory scattered widely across three districts of Mutsu Province. Although the nominal kokudaka was the same, this discontiguous territories were remote, unimproved and this order was thus a tremendous financial burden on the domain.  Naotoki died in Edo in 1802 at the age of 26. His grave is at the temple of Kisshō-ji in Tokyo.

Naoyasu was married to a daughter of Sagawa Nagahiro of Hitoyoshi Domain, and had 2 sons and 1 daughter.

See also
Mizoguchi clan

References 
 "Shibata-han" on Edo 300 HTML ) 
 The content of much of this article was derived from that of the corresponding article on Japanese Wikipedia.

Tozama daimyo
1778 births
1802 deaths
Mizoguchi clan
People of Edo-period Japan